The T360 is a pickup truck from Honda. Introduced in June 1963, it was Honda's first production automobile, beating the S500 Sports by four months.

The T360 used a 356 cc AK250E series DOHC inline-four engine also found in the Honda S360 roadster prototype, with which it also shared the chassis. The engine generated 30 hp (22 kW) at 8,500 rpm, reflecting Honda's motorcycle heritage. A total of 108,920 T360s were produced from 1963 through August 1967, all painted in "May Blue". It has a wraparound clamshell-style bonnet which leaves the headlights in place when opened.

The similar but somewhat larger T500 used a 38 hp (28 kW) 531 cc version of the engine, excluding it from the Kei car class. The T500, first shown in September 1964, was mainly intended for export markets. Its engine delivered high in the rev range (maximum power arrived at 7,500 rpm, with redline at 9,000 rpm) and was a slightly downtuned version of the one found in the Honda S500 sports car. A total of 10,226 T500s were built from 1964 through November 1967, and were all painted "Moss Green". Aside from the different color and engine, the T500 was 20 cm longer (all behind the rear axle), as its overall length was not dictated by the Kei regulations. Another minor distinction was the fittings for license plates larger than those of a Kei car, as well as a higher  load capacity.

The T360 was produced as a conventional rear wheel drive pickup truck, a flatbed (the T360F), flatbed with folding sides (the T360H), and as a covered van (the T360V). There was also a version of the T360 called the "Snow Crawler", equipped with tracked propulsion units at the rear. Due to its expense, the Snow Crawler remained a rarity in spite of its usefulness in certain parts of northern Japan. The T500 came either with a conventional pickup body (T500), or with the folding side flatbed, this time with the "F" suffix; called the T500F.

References

External links
 ThisOldHonda.org T360
 ThisOldHonda.org T500

First car made by manufacturer
T360
Kei trucks
Pickup trucks
Tracked vehicles
Cars introduced in 1963
Cars discontinued in 1967